North Carolina Highway 186 (NC 186) is a primary state highway in the U.S. state of North Carolina. Entirely in Northampton County, it helps facilitate truck traffic parallel to I-95 and connects the communities of Seaboard and Margarettsville.

Route description
NC 186 is a two-lane rural highway that traverses  from NC 48 near Gaston to the Virginia state line near Margarettsville. The first  parallel I-95 heading south before joining NC 46 towards Garysburg. Once in Garysburg, its concurrency with NC 46 ends and then briefly overlaps with US 301 before it heads in a northeasterly direction out of town. It then proceeds to connect Gumberry, Seaboard, and Margarettsville, before crossing the state line into Virginia, becoming Virginia State Route 186 (SR 186), and heading towards Branchville, Virginia and Boykins, Virginia.

History
Established around 1975 as a renumbering of NC 195; the number change was to match with Virginia's SR 186, which was originally SR 195 before I-195 was established in Richmond, Virginia, around 1970. It remained unchanged until May 21, 2013, when it was extended west and north from its former terminus at US 301 to NC 48. The justification for the extension was to help facilitate truck traffic and serve the Northampton Commerce Park and Enviva Industrial Facility, on what was SR 1200 (Lebanon Church Road and James Jones Road); it can also be used as an alternate route for I-95 in the event traffic has to be rerouted.

North Carolina Highway 195

North Carolina Highway 195 (NC 195) was established around 1938 as a renumbering of NC 305 between Garysburg to Seaboard, then continuing east on new primary routing into Virginia becoming SR 195. Around 1970, SR 195 was renumbered to SR 186; North Carolina reciprocated in 1975.

Junction list

References

External links

NCRoads.com: N.C. 186
NCRoads.com: N.C. 195

186
Transportation in Northampton County, North Carolina